Garra allostoma is a species of ray-finned fish in the genus Garra. It is known only from the mountainous region around Bamenda in Cameroon, where it may be threatened by deforestation.

References 

Endemic fauna of Cameroon
Garra
Fish described in 1990